Street Racer or Street racer may refer to:

A person who participates in street racing
Street Racer (1977 video game), Atari 2600 video game
Street Racer (1994 video game), video game published by Ubisoft on various systems
Street Racer (film), 2008 film
Street Racers (film), a 2008 Russian action film